Hill City High School is a public high school located in Hill City, Minnesota, United States.

Athletics

Teams
Hill City's athletic teams are nicknamed the Hornets and the school's colors are purple and white. Hill City teams compete in the following sports:

Football
Volleyball
Boys basketball
Girls basketball
Baseball
Softball

Demographics
90% of the student population at Hill City High School identify as Caucasian, 7% identify as American Indian/Alaskan Native, and 2% identify as multiracial. The student body makeup is 52% male and 48% female.

References

External links
 Official site

Public high schools in Minnesota
Schools in Aitkin County, Minnesota